Chalarotona melipnoa is a moth in the family Xyloryctidae. It was described by Edward Meyrick in 1890. It is found in Australia, where it has been recorded from the Australian Capital Territory, New South Wales and South Australia.

The wingspan is 16–21 mm. The forewings are light yellowish ochreous and the hindwings are grey.

The larvae bore the flower spikes of Banksia ericifolia and Banksia marginata.

References

Chalarotona
Moths described in 1890